Fake news in India refers to misinformation or disinformation in the country which is spread through word of mouth and traditional media and more recently through digital forms of communication such as edited videos, memes, unverified advertisements and social media propagated rumours. Fake news spread through social media in the country has become a serious problem, with the potential of it resulting in mob violence, as was the case where at least 20 people were killed in 2018 as a result of misinformation circulated on social media.

Terminology and background
Fake news is defined as stories purporting to be news that are intentionally and verifiably false and has the capacity to misinform and mislead readers. In academic typology, fake news is classified into several forms along the axes of degree of facticity, motivation of deception and form of presentation; it includes satire and parody that have a basis in facts but can mislead when de-contextualised, it includes fabrications and manipulation of information which were created with the intent to deceive or mislead and also includes covert advertising and political propaganda which are aimed to deceive in an organised attempt to influence wider public opinion. The UNESCO Handbook for Journalism Education and Training provides an additional distinction of two forms of fake news, one that is deliberately created with the intention of targeting and causing harm to a social group, an organisation, a person or a country, described as disinformation and the other being simple misinformation that wasn't created for the purpose of causing harm. In India, fake news is predominantly disseminated by homegrown political disinformation campaigns.

Creators
According to newspaper The Telegraph, "a giant chunk of the disinformation is created and highlighted by an ecosystem close to the ruling Bharatiya Janata Party, the Narendra Modi government, and their supporters. Unsurprisingly, many of these fake claims serve their political interests."

Disinformation campaigns

Coronavirus
Misinformation related to coronavirus COVID-19 pandemic is in the form of social media messages related to home remedies that have not been verified, fake advisories and conspiracy theories. At least two people have been arrested for spreading fake news about the coronavirus pandemic. To counteract this, over 400 Indian Scientists are working together to debunk false information about the virus, as of 14 April 2020.

Citizenship (Amendment) Act 2019 
The CAA Protests led to a flooding of fake news and manipulated content on social media targeting the protesters and Delhi police alike. Members of the ruling BJP were seen to be sharing videos, falsely insinuating that the students of Aligarh Muslim University were raising anti-Hindu slogans. The Supreme Court of India asked the central government of India to consider "a plea for publicising aims, objectives and the benefits of the Citizenship Amendment Act (CAA) to weed out fake news that was being circulated on the issue." BJP leaders rolled out a phone number, asking people to give a missed call to show support for the act. The number was widely shared on twitter, with fake claims luring people with companionship with lonely women and free subscriptions to streaming platforms like Netflix.

Indian security and intelligence agencies reportedly identified around 5000 social media handles from Pakistan which were "spreading fake and false propaganda" on CAA, some using "deep fake videos" in the process. Social media platforms had mediators on look-out to curb fake, incendiary and communal news.

Old pictures and videos were shared on social media, even by prominent personalities, giving a communal spin to the protests. Old images were also used to insinuate that the protests involved violence in many sites. Similarly, some old clips involving police brutality were reposted and falsely purported to be linked with crackdown on CAA protesters. BJP's IT Cell Head Amit Malviya shared distorted videos misrepresenting anti-CAA protesters to be chanting "Pakistan Zindabad" and disturbing slogans against the Hindu community.

Elections 
Fake news was very prevalent during the 2019 Indian general election. Misinformation was prevalent at all levels of society during the build-up to the election. The elections were called by some as "India's first WhatsApp elections", with WhatsApp being used by many as a tool of propaganda. As VICE and AltNews write, "parties have weaponized the platforms" and "misinformation was weaponized" respectively.

India has 22 scheduled languages, and vetting information in all of them becomes difficult for multinationals like Facebook, which has only gathered the resources to vet 10 of them, leaving languages like Sindhi, Odia and Kannada completely unvetted, . Nevertheless, Facebook went on to remove nearly one million accounts a day, including ones spreading misinformation and fake news before the elections.

Fake news against Pakistan 
A study by the EU DisinfoLab in 2019 found that at least "265 fake local news websites in more than 65 countries are managed by Indian influence networks with the aim of influencing international institutions along with elected representatives and swaying the public perception of Pakistan." By 2020, the number of such pro-India fake news websites was revealed to have grown to 750 across 116 countries in an investigation titled the Indian Chronicles. Prominent examples of fake news-spreading websites and online resources include OpIndia and Postcard News.

According to the BBC News, many of the fake news websites were being run by an Indian company called the Srivastava Group, which was responsible for anti-Pakistan lobbying efforts in Europe and was persistently linked to the dissemination of fake news and propaganda. The websites, which are known to copy syndicated news content from other media outlets in order to appear as real news websites, plant opinion pieces and stories critical of Pakistan from individuals who belong to NGOs linked to their network.

The network attempts to influence decision-making organisations such as the UN Human Rights Council and European Parliament, where its primary aim is to "discredit Pakistan". In October 2019, the network sponsored a controversial trip of a group of far-right European Parliament MPs to Indian-administered Kashmir, during which they also met prime minister Narendra Modi.

Domains operated by the group included the "Manchester Times", "Times of Los Angeles", "Times of Geneva" and "New Delhi Times" among others. A common theme of their coverage tends to be on issues such as secessionist groups, minorities, human rights cases and terrorism in Pakistan.

The EU Chronicle, a Srivasta Group website which claimed to deliver news from the European Union, was found to have op-ed articles "falsely attributed to their authors, some of them European lawmakers", journalists who seemed to not exist, text plagiarised from other sources, and content mostly focused on Pakistan. EPToday, another news website which highlighted anti-Pakistan material, was forced to shut down after it was similarly exposed according to Politico Europe.

As part of its efforts to project Indian lobbying interests, the network had resurrected fake personas of dead human rights activists and journalists, impersonated regular media agencies such as The Economist and Voice of America, used European Parliament letterheads, listed fake phone numbers and addresses including that of the UN on its websites, created obscure book publishing companies and public personalities, registered hundreds of fake NGOs, think tanks, informal groups and imam organisations, as well as conducted cybersquatting on Pakistani domains. Most of the websites had a presence on social media such as Twitter.

It was also noted that following EU DisinfoLab's first report in 2019, some domains had closed only to be resurrected under different names later. Researchers state that the main target of the fake websites' content is not readers in Europe, but rather mainstream Indian news outlets such as ANI and Yahoo News India who routinely reuse and republish their material and act as their conduit to hundreds of millions in India.

Kashmir 
Misinformation and disinformation related to Kashmir is widely prevalent. There have been multiple instances of pictures from the Syrian and the Iraqi civil wars being passed off as from the Kashmir conflict with the intention of fueling unrest and backing insurgencies.

In August 2019, following the Indian revocation of Jammu and Kashmir's Article 370, disinformation related to whether people were suffering or not, lack of supplies and other administration issues followed. The official Twitter accounts of the CRPF and Kashmir Police apart from other government handles called out misinformation and disinformation in the region. The Ministry of Electronics and Information Technology assisted by getting Twitter to suspend accounts spreading fake inciteful news.

The Indian Army and media houses such as India Today denied various claims such as the Indian Army burning down houses, the deaths of six personnel in cross border firing, and a series of "torture" allegations made by activist Shehla Rashid via Twitter.

On the other hand, The New York Times claimed officials in New Delhi were portraying a sense of normality in the region, whereas "security personnel in Kashmir said large protests kept erupting". The newspaper quoted a soldier Ravi Kant saying "mobs of a dozen, two dozen, even more, sometimes with a lot of women, come out, pelt stones at us and run away." The Supreme Court of India was told by the Solicitor General Tushar Mehta that "not a single bullet has been fired by security forces after August 5", however BBC reported otherwise. The Supreme Court went onto say that the center should make "every endeavor to restore the normalcy as early as possible."

Other examples 

 Imposters posing as army personnel on the social media have been called out by the Indian Army as false news and disinformation.
As part of the 2016 Indian banknote demonetisation, India introduced a new 2,000-rupee currency note. Following this, multiple fake news reports about "spying technology" added in the banknotes went viral on WhatsApp and had to be dismissed by the government.
The NaMo app, an app dedicated to Narendra Modi, the Prime Minister of India, was reported to have promoted and spread fake news.

Modes of distribution

Social media 
The damage caused due to fake news on social media has increased due to the growth of the internet penetration in India, which has risen from 137 million internet users in 2012 to over 600 million in 2019. Fake news is also spread through Facebook and Twitter.

Impact

Socio-political 
Fake news is frequently used to target minorities and has become a significant cause of localised violence as well as large scale riots. Engineered mass violence was instigated during the 2013 Muzaffarnagar riots, through a disinformation campaign propagating the love jihad conspiracy theory and circulating a fake news video.

Institutional 
Internet shutdowns are used by the government as a way to control social media rumours from spreading. Ideas such as linking Aadhaar to social media accounts has been suggested to the Supreme Court of India by the Attorney General.

In November 2019, the Indian ministry of information and broadcasting planned to set up a FACT checking module to counter the circulation of fake news by continuous monitoring of online news sources and publicly visible social media posts. The module will work on the four principles of "Find, Assess, Create and Target" (FACT). The module will initially will be run by information service officers. Near the end of 2019, the Press Information Bureau (which comes under the Ministry of Information and Broadcasting) set up a fact-checking unit which would focus on verifying news related to the government.

Journalists in Kashmir have been subjected to repeated criminal proceedings which led to three UN OHCHR Special Rapporteurs expressing concerns over a "pattern of silencing independent reporting on the situation in Jammu & Kashmir through the threat of criminal sanction", specifically mentioning journalists Gowhar Geelani, Masrat Zahra, Naseer Ganai and Peerzada Ashiq and reiterating the position affirmed at the 2017 Joint Declaration on Fake News, Disinformation and Propaganda that "general prohibitions on the dissemination of information based on vague and ambiguous ideas, including "false news" or "non objective information" are incompatible with international standards for restrictions on freedom of expression."

The J&K administration released a new Media Policy-2020 on 15 May 2020 which read that "any individual or group indulging in fake news, unethical or anti national activities or in plagiarism shall be de-empaneled besides being proceeded against under law". Writing for EPW, Geeta wrote that the policy would serve to "make citizens passive recipients of the information" disseminated by the government. The Indian Express published an editorial stating that "at a time when democratic political voices remain missing" in the Union Territory, the policy is an "affront, intended to keep control of the narrative of J&K." The Press Council of India stated that the provisions regarding fake news affect the free functioning of the press.

Countermeasures

Fact checking organisations 
Fact-checking in India has become a business, spurning the creation of fact-checking websites such as BOOM, Alt News, Factly and SMHoaxSlayer. Media houses also have their own fact-checking departments now such as the India Today Group, Times Internet has TOI Factcheck and The Quint has WebQoof. India Today Group, Vishvas.news, Factly, Newsmobile, and Fact Crescendo (all International Fact-Checking Network certified) are Facebook partners in fact-checking.

Grassroot measures 
In some parts of India like Kannur in Kerala, the government conducted fake news classes in government schools. Some say the government should conduct more public-education initiatives to make the population more aware of fake news.

In 2018, Google News launched a program to train 8000 journalists in seven official Indian languages including English. The program, Google's largest training initiative in the world, would spread awareness of fake news and anti-misinformation practices such as fact-checking.

Countermeasures by social media companies 
In India, Facebook has partnered with fact-checking websites such as BOOM and Webqoof by The Quint. Following over 30 killings linked to rumours spread over WhatsApp, WhatsApp introduced various measures to curb the spread of misinformation, which included limiting the number of people a message could be forwarded to as well as introducing a tip-line among other measures such as suspending accounts and sending cease-and-desist letters. WhatsApp also added a small tag, forwarded, to relevant messages. They also started a course for digital literacy and came out with full page advertisements in newspapers in multiple languages. Twitter has also taken action to curb the spread of fake news such as deleting accounts.

Law enforcement
In 2022, the Tamil Nadu Government announced formation of a special Social Media Monitoring Centre, under Tamil Nadu Police "to monitor and curb the spread of fake news and misinformation online".

See also 

 Indian WhatsApp lynchings
Godi Media

References 

Bibliography
 Pratik Sinha (2019). India Misinformed: The True Story. HarperCollins India.

Further reading
 
 
Malik, Shahnawaz Ahmed, Fake News: Legal Analysis of False and Misleading News and Cyber Propaganda (February 5, 2019). AD VALOREM- Journal of Law: Volume 6: Issue II: Part-III: April–June 2019: ISSN : 2348–5485.
Arun, Chinmayi, On WhatsApp, Rumours, Lynchings, and the Indian Government (January 3, 2019). Economic & Political Weekly vol. lIV no. 6.
Nagar, Itisha and Gill, Simran, Head is Where the Herd is: Fake News and Effect of Online Social Conformity on Islamophobia in Indians. SSHO-D-20-00611, Available at SSRN: or 

Disinformation
Society of India
Godi media
Fake news in India